The Vancouver Canucks are a franchise team in the National Hockey League (NHL). , 61 goaltenders and 561 skaters (forwards and defencemen) have appeared in at least one regular-season and/or playoff game with the Canucks since the team joined the NHL in the inaugural 1970–71 season. The 621 all-time members of the Canucks are listed below, with statistics complete through the end of the 2019–20 NHL season. It includes players that have played at least one regular season or playoff game for the Vancouver Canucks since the franchise was established in 1970.

The "Seasons" column lists the first year of the season of the player's first game and the last year of the season of the player's last game. For example, a player who played one game in the 2000–01 NHL season would be listed as playing with the team from 2000–2001, regardless of what calendar year the game occurred within.

There have been 13 Canucks players who have served as the captain. The franchise's first captain was Orland Kurtenbach, who captained the team until his retirement in 1974. The longest-tenured Canucks captain was Stan Smyl, who was appointed for eight seasons. Smyl and Henrik Sedin are the only Canucks captains to have spent their entire NHL playing career with the team. Trevor Linden, who captained from 1990 to 1997, played 16 seasons with the Canucks, a franchise high. Swede Markus Naslund, who captained for seven seasons, was the first non-Canadian to have captained the Canucks. Though goaltenders are not permitted to act as captains during games, Roberto Luongo served as the captain from 2008 to 2010, but because of the NHL rule against goaltender captains, the League did not allow Luongo to serve as captain on-ice. In his place, Willie Mitchell was responsible for dealing with officials during games, while Henrik Sedin was responsible for ceremonial faceoffs and other ceremonial duties. Luongo was not permitted to wear the "C" on his jersey, but it was incorporated into the artwork on the front of his mask. The current captain of the Vancouver Canucks is Bo Horvat, who became captain beginning in the 2019–20 NHL season. 



Key
  Appeared in a Canucks' game during the 2019–2020 season.
  Hockey Hall of Famer, or retired number.

This list does not include data from the Vancouver Canucks of the Pacific Coast Hockey League or Western Hockey League.Statistics complete as of the 2019–2020 NHL season.''

Goaltenders

Skaters

Notes

Statistical notes 
a: As of the 2005–2006 NHL season, all games will have a winner, teams losing in overtime and shootouts are awarded one point thus the OTL stat replacees the tie statistic. The OTL column also includes SOL (Shootout losses).
b: Save percentage did not become an official NHL statistic until the 1982–83 season.  Therefore, goaltenders who played before 1982 do not have official save percentages.

Player notes 
Beginning in the 2005–06 season, ties are no longer possible. At the same time, the league began tracking overtime losses for goaltenders.
Trevor Linden shared the NHL Foundation Player Award with Vincent Lecavalier of the Tampa Bay Lightning.
Marek Malik shared the NHL Plus-Minus Award with Martin St. Louis of the Tampa Bay Lightning after both players had a plus/minus of +35.

References
General

Specific

Vancouver Canucks
 
players